List of (arch)bishops of Lund. Until the Danish Reformation the centre of a great Latin (arch)bishopric, Lund has been in Sweden since the Treaty of Roskilde in 1658. The Diocese of Lund is now one of thirteen in the Church of Sweden.

Catholic Episcopate 
(all Roman Rite; some dates disputed according to the source)Suffragan Bishops of Lund Henrik (1060–1065? or 1048? – death 21 August 1060)
 Egino (1065? – death 19 October 1072); ?former bishop of Dalby
  (1072 or 1075 – death 26 May 1089)
 Ascer (1089–1103 see below)Metropolitan Archbishops of Lund Ascer (see above 1103 – death 5 May 1137)
 Eskil (1138 or 1137–1177 or 1179)
 Absalon Hvide (1177 or 1179 – death 21 March 1201)
 Andreas Sunesen (1201–1222 or 1223)
  (11 January 1224 – death 11 July 1228)
  (1228 or 1230 – death 15 December 1252)
 Jakob Erlandsen (13 August 1253 – death 18 February 1274)
  (13 January 1276 or 1277 – death 2 May 1280)
  (13 April 1280 or 1282 – death 28 April 1288 or 1299)
 Jens Grand (18 March 1289 or 1290 – 30 March 1302), later * titular Prince-Archbishop of Riga (Latvia, 30 March 1304 or 1302 – 11 February 1310), Prince-Archbishop of Bremen (11 February 1310 – death 30 May 1327)
  (Isarnus Takkon; 11 April 1302 – 12 June 1310), from Fontiès-d'Aude, previously Prince-Archbishop of Riga (Latvia, 19 December 1300 – 11 April 1302 or 1303), later Metropolitan Archbishop of Salerno (Italy) (12 June 1310 – death September 1310)
  (15 June 1310 – death 17 January 1325)
  (9 October 1325 – death 16 May 1334)
  (27 February 1334 or 1336 – death 16 April 1355)
  (5 October 1355 – death 23 January 1361)
  (25 October 1361 – death 5 February 1379)
  (May 1379 – death 2 March 1390)
  (7 October 1390 – death 31 December 1391)
  (13 July 1392 – death 18 April 1410)
  (28 July 1410 – death 4 April 1418)
  (7 October 1418 – death 1436)
  (21 May 1436 – death 30 May 1443)
  (7 June 1443 – death 7 April 1472)
  (18 April 1472 or 1474 – death 2 June 1497)
  (9 May 1497 or 1498 – death 23 November 1519)
 Aage Jepsen Sparre (December 1519 – June 1532)
  (5 January 1520 – 1521 or 1523)
 Apostolic Administrator Cardinal Paolo Emilio Cesi (6 February 1520 – 12 July 1521), Cardinal-Deacon of S. Nicola fra le Immagini pro illa vice Deaconry (6 July 1517 – 5 September 1534), later held various other apostolic administrator assignments, finally transferred Cardinal-Deacon of S. Eustachio (5 September 1534 – death 5 August 1537)
 Didrik Slagheck (1521–1522)
 Johan Weze (1522–1532)
  (27 July 1532 – death January 1553)

 Lutheran superintendents and bishops 

 1537–1551 – 
 1551–1560 – 
 1560–1577 – 
 1578–1589 – 
 1589–1611 – 
 1611–1619 – 
 1620–1637 – 
 1638–1658 – Peder Winstrup see below 1676–1679 – Peder Winstrup see belowDenmark recaptured Scania 1676–1679; Peder Winstrup continued as bishop during these years.In Sweden
 1658–1676 – Peder Winstrup see above''
 1679–1687 – Canutus Hahn
 1688–1694 – 
 1694–1714 – Mathias Steuchius
 1715–1734 – 
 1734–1738 – 
 1738–1740 – 
 1740–1747 – Henrik Benzelius
 1748–1777 – 
 1777–1794 – 
 1794–1803 – 
 1805–1811 – Nils Hesslén
 1811–1854 – 
 1854–1856 – Henrik Reuterdahl
 1856–1865 – Johan Henrik Thomander
 1865–1897 – 
 1898–1925 – Gottfrid Billing
 1925–1948 – Edvard Rodhe
 1949–1958 – Anders Nygren
 1958–1960 – Nils Bolander
 1960–1970 – 
 1970–1980 – 
 1980–1992 – Per-Olov Ahrén
 1992–1997 – Karl Gustav Hammar
 1997–2007 – Christina Odenberg
 2007–2014 – Antje Jackelén
 2014–present – Johan Tyrberg

References

External links 
 Lunds domkyrka och domkyrkoförsamling – biskopslängd
 GCatholic with incumbent bio links

Lund
Bishops of Lund